Enric R. Madriguera (17 February 1902 – 7 September 1973) was a violinist of Catalan origin who was playing concerts as a child before he studied at the Barcelona Conservatory. (The Castilian form of his name is Enrique, which he sometimes used on records.)

Biography
He was born in Barcelona, Spain, and whilst still in his twenties he was lead violinist at Boston's and Symphony orchestras, before becoming the conductor of the Cuban Philharmonic.

In the late 1920s, Madriguera played in Ben Selvin's studio orchestra at Columbia Records in New York, and served briefly as that company's director of Latin music recording. In 1932, he began his own orchestra at the Biltmore Hotel, which recorded for Columbia until 1934. His music at this period was mostly Anglo-American dance or foxtrot, frequently jazz-inflected, although he had a modest hit with his rhumba rendition of "Carioca" (1934).

By the 1930s he was recording Latin American music almost exclusively. (His composition "Adios" became a national hit in 1931.) On his radio appearances, the band was billed as "Enric Madriguera and His Music of the Americas," and "Adios" was its theme song. It was said that the ambassadors from all the South American countries declared Madriguera to be the 'Ambassador of Music to all the Americas'.  Madriguera appeared in a number of "musical shorts" including "Enric Madriguera and his Orchestra" (1946), where he performed a number of songs including the orchestra for his vocalist-wife, Patricia Gilmore. A review of one of his appearances recorded how he "reflected the warmth of our neighbors to the south".

He died in retirement in Danbury, Connecticut. His sister was pianist Paquita Madriguera, the second wife of Andres Segovia.

References

External links
 Enric Madriguera recordings at the Discography of American Historical Recordings.
 Enric Madriguera's discography can be searched at the National Library of Catalonia

1902 births
1973 deaths
Musicians from Catalonia
Conductors (music) from Catalonia
Male conductors (music)
20th-century Spanish musicians
Rhumba musicians
20th-century conductors (music)
20th-century Spanish male musicians